ZeroGravity is a stunt team based in southern California. They were founded in 1998 by Tony Chu and Kerry Wong. Their first performance was in the Specialties Act division of the 1998 Pinnacle Fantasy Productions Talent Spokesmodel Showcase and continued to perform martial arts stage shows for several years. ZeroGravity is also known for their independent martial arts films and being the motion capture actors for The Matrix Online and Devil May Cry 3: Dante's Awakening.

History
ZeroGravity began by performing martial arts stage shows at various cultural festivals, talent showcases, and import car shows. In 2000, they branched into the indie film genre by making short martial arts, action films. At this point, their focus began to shift more from stage shows to their film projects. Other early projects included stunt work in an indie martial arts film starring Ho Sung Pak titled Epoch of the Lotus. In 2001, Kerry Wong moved to Los Angeles and founded a new division of the stunt group named ZeroGravity South. At that time The original group was renamed ZeroGravity North. Shortly after, Kerry Wong established relationships with ACT, an action stunt training group in Los Angeles. Through this new relationship Reuben Langdon and other members of ACT joined ZeroGravity South. After the release of Title Pending 2 and Damn 3, the group began devoting their efforts to breaking into the film business as stunt performers. Several members have also done motion capture for some well known video games, like The Matrix Online and Devil May Cry 3. Some members even provided voice overs for characters in Devil May Cry 3, with Reuben Langdon returning as the voice of Dante in Devil May Cry 4.  In addition, Langdon was featured in the tokusatsu B-Fighter Kabuto, as well as stunt work for Power Rangers.  Lateef Crowder was also a villain in the 2005 Tony Jaa film, Tom-Yum -Goong. Other works include small bit parts (mostly martial arts or fighting oriented) in the TV series Monk and Entourage. Reuben Langdon and Aaron Toney are planned to be villains in the American TV series Kamen Rider Dragon Knight.  The team was also featured on Animal Planet's Most Extreme.

Independent films
Their first film, Title Pending, featured no dialogue or sound effects but instead played music, much like silents films from the early 20th century. The films run from 10 to 20 minutes in length and had many lengthy fight sequences. They were distributed largely over the internet where they gained popularity. Other early films included a series called Damn, Kid Gusto vs The Matrix, and US vs HK. After producing their earlier films, the group began to release films less frequently but increased the production level by using higher-quality cameras, adding more dialogue and incorporating more plot elements than before.

Film chronology
Title Pending - 2001
Damn - 2001
Damn 2 - 2001
Kid Gusto vs The Matrix - 2001
Damn 4 - 2001
US vs HK (US versus Hong Kong) - 2001
Title Pending 2 - 2002
Damn 3 - 2003
Cha Cha Chinaman - 2004
Hero vs Alien - 2004
Inmate 451 - 2006
An Act of Revenge - 2008
Yeah Sure Okay - 2009

Members
ZeroGravity has had numerous members join since its inception. Some members joined for single projects and left shortly afterwards. Members also sometimes participate in other projects and collaborations with other stunt groups. With a large influx of members interested in their film projects, ZeroGravity began a screening process which consisted of a 3-hour test of stunt work, acrobatics, and fight choreography. This screening process is no longer in use.

ZeroGravity North
Tony Chu
Ken Quitugua
Roy Chen
Tiffany Reyes
Adam Phelps

ZeroGravity South
Kerry Wong
Larry Leong
Lateef Crowder
Sam Looc
Aaron Toney
Samuel Yu
Reuben Langdon
Ilram Choi
Ken Ohara
Lianne Lin
Andrew Suleiman
Mike Wilson
Darian Vorlick (Matrix Online and Animal Planet)

External links

Theatrical combat